Paul Kugler (24 September 1889 – 2 February 1962) was a German international footballer.

References

1889 births
1962 deaths
Association football forwards
German footballers
Germany international footballers